Tarzan Triumphant is a novel by American writer Edgar Rice Burroughs, the fifteenth in his series of twenty-four books about the title character Tarzan.  The novel was originally serialized in the magazine Blue Book from October, 1931 through March 1932. It should not be confused with the 1943 film Tarzan Triumphs, as the plots are not related.

Real-life Soviet dictator Joseph Stalin is used as a minor character in the novel, though he remains in Moscow and does not personally take part in the action.

Plot summary
Backed by Chief Muviro and his faithful Waziri warriors, Tarzan faces Soviet agents seeking revenge and a lost tribe descended from early Christians practicing a bizarre and debased version of the religion.

Comic adaptations
The book has been adapted into comic form by Gold Key Comics in Tarzan nos. 184-185, dated June–July 1969, with a script by Gaylord DuBois and art by Doug Wildey.

Sources

External links
 
ERBzine.com Illustrated Bibliography entry for Edgar Rice Burroughs' Tarzan Triumphant
Edgar Rice Burroughs Summary Project page for Tarzan Triumphant
Text of the novel at Project Gutenberg Australia 

1932 American novels
1932 fantasy novels
Books about Joseph Stalin
Novels first published in serial form
Tarzan novels by Edgar Rice Burroughs
Works originally published in Blue Book (magazine)